Binary Finary are a British trance act, originally comprising Matt Laws, Ricky Grant and Stuart Matheson.  They are best known for the dance hit single "1998", especially for the Paul van Dyk and Gouryella remixes, which charted in many countries. The song was remixed numerous times under the title of the year the remix was produced ("1999" and "2000" etc.), many of which were popular. In the UK, "1998" reached a peak position of No. 24 in the UK Singles Chart whereas "1999" reached No. 11. It was covered by the indie group Peace in the song, "1998 (Delicious)".

On 1 May 2006, they released a collection of 16 tracks written over their eight-year sabbatical under the general title, The Lost Tracks. This album is available only for download. Binary Finary are also featured in a Shiny Toy Guns song, "When Did This Storm Begin?".

On New Year's Eve 2009, at Etihad Stadium in Melbourne at Sensation, they launched the 'Binary Finary LIVE' show, using original material and re-makes of classic dance tracks.

In 2010 Sasha Vatoff joined who acts as DJ and live performer.

Discography

Studio albums
2006 – The Lost Tracks

Singles

1997 – "1998" / "Zapya"
1998 – "Anthemic 1&2"
2001 – "Niterider"
2005 – "Difference" (with Jose Amnesia pres. Cloudbreak)
2011 – "Isle Of Lies" (with Daniel Wanrooy)
2011 – "Replode" (with Matthew Nagle)
2011 – "Freedom Seekers" (with Trent McDermott)
2011 – "Carbon Fibre" (with Rodrigo Deem)
2012 – "Smoking Gun" (with Genix)
2012 – "High Stress" (with Pulse & Sphere)
2012 – "Subliminal Delusions" (with Solange)
2012 – "Flight Of Life"
2013 – "The Annex"
2013 – "Deception"
2013 – "Mainframe" (with Kris Maydak)
2013 – "Waiting For The Sun" (with Lele Troniq feat. Christina Novelli)
2013 – "Escherian" (with Alan Crown)
2013 – "Folded & Molded" (with Vegas Baby!)
2013 – "Tornado" (with Alpha Duo)
2014 – "Dark Side" (vs. Iversoon & Alex Daf)
2014 – "Symphony of Mystery" (feat. Chris Arnott)
2014 – "Psychosis" (with Dreamy)
2014 – "Forever Neon"
2014 – "DeLorean" (with Mino Safy)
2014 – "Trancelation" (with Frank Duffel)
2015 – "Annihilation" (with Alpha Duo)
2015 – "Rise" (with Harmonic Rush)
2015 – "Now Is The Time" (with KINETICA)
2015 – "One & Only" (vs. Allen & Envy feat. Radmila)
2015 – "Apollo Rising" (with Nicholson)
2015 – "Don't Hurt" (with Dreamy feat. Natalie Gioia)
2016 – "Believe In Everything" (with Talla 2XLC feat. Sylvia Tosun)
2016 – "The Vortex"
2016 – "We Are In Control"
2018 – "1998" (re-issue)
2019 – "In Our Blood" (with KINETICA feat. Audrey Gallagher)
2019 – "Syntax"

Remixes
2011 – Spanking Machine - "Permission" (Binary Finary Remix)
2011 – Ernesto vs. Bastian - "Darkside Of The Moon" (Binary Finary Monster Remix / Dubstep Remix)
2016 – The Visions Of Shiva - "Perfect Day" (Binary Finary's Sunrise Remix)
2017 – Dark Monks - "Insane" (Binary Finary Remix)
2018 – Travel - "Bulgarian" (Binary Finary Remix)
2018 – Mauro Picotto - "Komodo" (Binary Finary Extended Remix)
2019 – Commander Tom - "Are Am Eye?" (Binary Finary Remix)
2019 – Jurgen Vries - "The Theme" (Binary Finary Extended Remix)

References

External links

British trance music groups
English electronic music groups
Electronic dance music duos
Armada Music artists
Musical groups established in 1997
Positiva Records artists